Sakura Revolution is the second single released by Prits, a voice acting unit composed of Hisayo Mochizuki, Nana Mizuki, Natsuko Kuwatani, and Yumiko Kobayashi; all joined from the anime, Sister Princess. This particular album is part of the "three-month spree" of releasing singles by this voice acting unit under the Starchild label. The first track,  is also included in Dengeki G's Radio Complication Mini Album "G Raji Ongakubu". Natsuko Kuwatani, one of the four singers, introduced the second track, Frozen Lover, as a part of the coming album called cherry blossom during a radio session; once misunderstood the atmosphere of the song as "love being melted like ice cream or sherbet would" because she did not study the lyrics in advance.

Track listing

External links
  Official website > CD section (from the old ASCII Media Works archive)
  Amazon Japan

References

Sister Princess
Anime songs
2002 singles